"Cardiac Arrest" is a song by English ska band Madness from their third studio album 7 (1981) and other compilation album called Complete Madness (1982). It spent 10 weeks in UK charts peaking at number 14.

The song was written by Chas Smash and Chris Foreman and tells a story of a workaholic who suffers a fatal heart attack on his way to work. It was the first Madness single since "The Prince" which did not reach the UK top 10.

The album version of the song ends after the second chorus with a dramatic cut to a coda representing the man's heart thudding and then stopping. The single version replaces this with a repeat of the more optimistic first chorus, which fades out.

The music video for "Cardiac Arrest" featured Chas Smash as a person having a heart attack and the remaining band members playing roles of people advising him not to work so hard. The video follows the single version of the song rather than the album version.

The B-side, "In the City", was originally written by Bill Crutchfield, Chas Smash, Chris Foreman, Daisuke Inoue, Suggs, and Mike Barson for a Japanese television advertisement for Honda City cars. The various versions of the advert, including variations using "Driving in My Car" instead of "In the City", appear between tracks on the 1992 Divine Madness video.

In the Netherlands the single was released as a double A-side, and peaked at number 15 in the Dutch Top 40. In the US, "Cardiac Arrest" was released on the compilation album Madness and the B-side of their "Our House" single.

Although the song was a chart success, it was very rarely performed live - apart from featuring in a few gigs around the time of its release, it was not performed again until the "Can't Touch Us Now" tour in winter 2016.

Track listing
7" single
"Cardiac Arrest" – 2:58
"In the City" – 2:56

12" single
"Cardiac Arrest" (Extended 12" Version) – 4:10
"In the City" – 2:56

Charts

References

External links
 

1982 singles
Madness (band) songs
Songs written by Chris Foreman
Songs written by Chas Smash
1982 songs
Stiff Records singles
Song recordings produced by Clive Langer
Song recordings produced by Alan Winstanley
Songs about death